National Institute of Population Research and Training (NIPORT) is an autonomous national research institute that researches family planning in Bangladesh and training government officers involved with family planning projects in Bangladesh and is located in Dhaka, Bangladesh.

History
The institute was formed in July 1977 as the National Institute of Population Training. In 1980 the institute was placed in charge of the Family Welfare Visitors'Training Institutes and Regional Training Centres. The institute carries out population surveys in Bangladesh. It is under the Ministry of Health and Family Welfare.

References

Government agencies of Bangladesh
Research institutes in Bangladesh
1977 establishments in Bangladesh
Organisations based in Dhaka
Population research organizations